Levita may refer to:

People:
Levita Adalbert (died c. 710 in Egmond), Northumbrian Anglo-Saxon missionary
Benedict Levita, the pseudonym attached to a forged collection of capitularies that appeared in the ninth century
Cecil Levita, KCVO, CBE, DL (1867–1953), British soldier, Chairman of the London County Council in 1928
Elia Levita (1469–1549), Renaissance Hebrew grammarian, scholar and poet
Ohad Levita (born 1986), Israeli footballer
Robin de Levita (born 1959), Dutch theatre and television producer
San Sossio Levita e Martire (275–305), Deacon of Misenum, a naval base of the Roman Empire in the Bay of Naples

Other:
Maestro Levita, 1938 Argentine film directed by Luis César Amadori
Levita Stadium, football stadium in Kfar Saba, Israel

See also
Evita (disambiguation)
Levitan
Levitha